Magnus Bruun Nielsen (born 3 January 1984) is a Danish actor. He is known internationally for portraying Cnut of Northumbria in the television series The Last Kingdom and the male version of Eivor in the video game Assassin's Creed Valhalla.

Filmography

Television

Video games

Web

References

External links
 

1984 births
Living people
People from Hillerød Municipality
Danish male film actors
Danish male television actors
Danish male video game actors
Danish male voice actors